Damascenine is an alkaloid found in the plant Nigella damascena.

References

Alkaloids found in plants
Methyl esters
Anthranilates
Phenol ethers